John Adams Posey (1889–1963) was an attorney and political figure in Indiana.

Posey served as Judge of the Perry-Spencer Circuit Court, and as Prosecuting Attorney after serving as a pilot in the
Army Air Corps during World War I.  His family was prominent in southern Indiana politics for more than a century:  He
was the son of Francis B. Posey, grandson of John Wesley Posey, and a distant relative of General Thomas Posey.

References

Posey Family Crest

1889 births
1963 deaths